Karuna Badwal is an Indian film producer; she has co-produced hit films like Chennai Express and Happy New Year.

Career
She started her film career as Shahrukh Khan's business manager.

Personal life
She is married to Ravinder Singh Badwal and the couple have two children Hans Badwal and Shums Badwal.

Filmography

References

External links 

  Happy New Year (2014 film)    
  Chennai Express

Living people
Film producers from Mumbai
Year of birth missing (living people)
Indian women film producers
Hindi film producers
Businesswomen from Maharashtra